K2 is a South African commercial rock band from Bloemfontein.

Biography
K2 have played since 2004 at various festivals: KKNK, Aardklop, Gariep Festival, NAMPO, Volksblad Arts Festival, Aardtappel festival, Loskopdam festival, Grahamstown festival, ARTSA, etc. K2 have also played at places such as Windmill Casino, Flamingo Casino, Royal Bafokeng Sports Palace SA vs NZ, Boktown BFN 2007 & 2008, Vodacom Park - Bloemfontein, ABSA Park – Kimberley and OFM Classic Cycle Races 2006 & 2007. The South African band was also at the Standerton Highveld Show in 2007 and has featured on "Fiesta on Kyknet". They have shared the stage with various artists in South Africa such as Mean Mr Mustard, Prime Circle, Watershed, Parlatones, Wonderboom, and many more, and have been a backing band for Arno Jordaan and Pieter Smith. From the band debut album "Hoogste Piek", two of their songs ("Dans nou nader on Rots 3" and "Spook on Diep 6") are nationally available. Another of their songs "Ek hou van jou" has been listed on various radio stations such as OFM, Bay FM, Radio Panorama and Radio Laeveld. "Signs" and "Help me believe" have been played on UJFM & Pukke FM. "Help me believe" was number 1 for 5 weeks on Kovsie FM TOP 30.

K2 has completed their second album and signed a record deal. The new album is being recorded by Darryl Wayne De Lange of Musicology and will only be available in English. The band also provide their own sound system and have also provided sound for shows at Volksblad Arts Festival for – Navi Redd, Lize Beekman, Anna Davel, Prime Circle, Bok van Blerk, Bosveldklong, Jay-Cee, Quintin Prinsloo, Karlien Husselman, Spoonfeedas and many more.

Members
Frans Wessels 
Danie Wessels 
Romeo Moalusi 
Leon Botha

Albums
Hoogste piek
The Battle

References

External links
 

People from Bloemfontein
South African rock music groups